Pacatian (died c. 248) was a usurper in the Danube area of the Roman Empire during the time of Philip the Arab.

He is known from coins, and from mentions in Zosimus and Zonaras, who say that he was an officer in one of the Danube legions. According to Zosimus, the revolts of Pacatian in Moesia (he probably controlled Viminacium) and Jotapian in Syria prompted Philip to make an offer to the Roman Senate to step down, but the senator Decius (who was sent by Philip to deal with the rebellion), correctly predicted that Pacatian would soon be killed by his own men before his own arrival.

External links

 Körner essay on usurpers
 Pacatianus coinage

248 deaths
3rd-century Roman usurpers
Crisis of the Third Century
Moesia
Year of birth unknown
Claudii